In fluid dynamics, Kerr–Dold vortex is an exact solution of Navier–Stokes equations, which represents  steady periodic vortices superposed on the stagnation point flow (or extensional flow). The solution was discovered by Oliver S. Kerr and John W. Dold in 1994. These steady solutions exist as a result of a balance between vortex stretching by the extensional flow and viscous dissipation, which are similar to Burgers vortex. These vortices were observed experimentally in a four-roll mill apparatus by Lagnado and L. Gary Leal.

Mathematical description
To this flow, an additional periodic disturbance can be added such that the new velocity field can be written as

Kerr and Dold showed that such disturbances exist with finite amplitude, thus making the solution an exact to Navier–Stokes equations. Introducing a stream function   for the disturbance velocity components, the equations for disturbances in vorticity-streamfunction formulation can be shown to reduce to

where  is the disturbance vorticity. A  single parameter 

can be obtained upon non-dimensionalization, which measures the strength of the converging flow to viscous dissipation. The solution will be assumed to be

Since  is real, it is easy to verify that  Since the expected vortex structure has the symmetry , we have . Upon substitution, an infinite sequence of differential equation will be obtained which are coupled non-linearly. To derive the following equations, Cauchy product rule will be used. The equations are

The boundary conditions

and the corresponding symmetry condition is enough to solve the problem. It can be shown that non-trivial solution exist only when  On solving this equation numerically, it is verified that keeping first 7 to 8 terms suffice to produce accurate results.

References

Flow regimes
Fluid dynamics